The 2013 CONCACAF Under-20 Championship was an association football tournament that took place between February 18 and March 3, 2013. The CONCACAF U-20 Championship determined the four CONCACAF teams that would participate at the 2013 FIFA U-20 World Cup.

Qualified teams

Four teams qualified through the Central American qualifying tournament and five qualified through the Caribbean qualifying tournament.

Note: no titles or runners-up between 1998 and 2007. 
Bold indicates that the corresponding team was hosting the event.

Venues

Squads

Group stage

The draw for the group stage was made on 21 November 2012. All times listed are local time, (UTC−06:00)

Group A

Group B

Group C

Group D

Knockout phase

Quarter-finals
Winners qualified for 2013 FIFA U-20 World Cup.

Semi-finals

Third place playoff

Final

Player awards
Top Goalscorer
 Ameth Ramírez (FW)

Most Valuable Player of the tournament
 Antonio Briseño  (LCB)
Golden Glove
 Richard Sánchez

Team of the tournament

Source:

Goalscorers
4 goals
 Amet Ramírez

3 goals

 Maykel Reyes
 Jesús Manuel Corona
 Jose Villarreal

2 goals

 Caleb Clarke
 Samuel Piette
 Arichel Hernandez
 Kendan Anderson
 Jairo Henríquez
 Antonio Briseño
 Marco Bueno
 Alonso Escoboza
 Julio Gómez
 Jairo Jiménez
 Daniel Cuevas
 Luis Gil

1 goal

 Dylan Carreiro
 Mauro Eustaquio
 Ben McKendry
 Stefan Vukovic
 David Ramírez
 John Jairo Ruíz
 Adrián Diz
 Daniel Luis
 Vidarrell Merencia
 Olivier Ayala
 Roberto González
 Rommel Mejia
 José Peña
 Maurice Jean-Dany
 Omar Holness
 Damion Lowe
 Jonathan Espericueta
 Francisco Flores
 Armando Zamorano
 Eulises Pavón
 Roberto Chen
 Alexander Gonzalez
 Romario Piggott
 Reid Strain
 Benji Joya
 Mario Rodriguez
 Wil Trapp

1 own goal
 Olivier Ayala (playing against Mexico)

Final ranking

Note: Per statistical convention in football, matches decided in extra time are counted as wins and losses, while matches decided by penalty shoot-out are counted as draws.

Countries to participate in 2013 FIFA U-20 World Cup
The four semi-finalist teams qualified for the 2013 FIFA U-20 World Cup.

References

External links
 

 
2013
Under
2013 CONCACAF U-20 Championship
2013 in youth association football